The Londonderry City by-election was a Parliamentary by-election held on 2 December 1914. The constituency returned one Member of Parliament (MP) to the House of Commons of the United Kingdom, elected by the first past the post voting system.

Liberal Sir James Brown Dougherty was elected unopposed. Dougherty was the last Liberal MP elected in Ireland.

Vacancy
James Hamilton, Marquis of Hamilton had been elected as a Unionist in the 1910 general election, facing Nationalist opposition.  He then succeeded to the Dukedom of Abercorn, resulting in the 1913 Londonderry City by-election, where the Roman Catholic hierarchy supported the Liberal David Hogg, a 73-year-old local shirt manufacturer and a Protestant.  Hogg died in August 1914 and the by-election was called for 30 November.

Previous result

Candidates
Dougherty was a Presbyterian minister, professor of Logic and English, and civil servant.

Result

Aftermath
Dougherty did not stand in the 1918 United Kingdom general election, when the seat was won by Eoin MacNeill of Sinn Féin in a contested election against Unionist and Nationalist candidates.

References

 Craig, F. W. S. (1974). British parliamentary election results 1885-1918 (1 ed.). London: Macmillan.

1914 elections in the United Kingdom
20th century in Derry (city)
By-elections to the Parliament of the United Kingdom in County Londonderry constituencies
Elections in Derry (city)
Unopposed by-elections to the Parliament of the United Kingdom in Irish constituencies
November 1914 events
1914 elections in Ireland